Cadherin-11 is a protein that in humans is encoded by the CDH11 gene.

Function 

This gene encodes a type II classical cadherin from the cadherin superfamily, integral membrane proteins that mediate calcium-dependent cell-cell adhesion. Mature cadherin proteins are composed of a large N-terminal extracellular domain, a single membrane-spanning domain, and a small, highly conserved C-terminal cytoplasmic domain. Type II (atypical) cadherins are defined based on their lack of a HAV cell adhesion recognition sequence specific to type I cadherins. Expression of this particular cadherin in osteoblastic cell lines, and its upregulation during differentiation, suggests a specific function in bone development and maintenance. The mammalian CDH-11 homologues are termed calsyntenin.

Relevance to cancer 

CDH11 is overexpressed in 15% of breast cancers and seems essential to tumour progression in some other cancer types.

Drug interactions 
Arthritis drug celecoxib binds to CDH11.

Interactions 

CDH11 has been shown to interact with CDH2.

References

Further reading

External links